Gilroy may refer to:
 Gilroy (surname)
 Gilroy or John Gilroy (artist) (1898–1985), English artist and illustrator
 Gilroy, California, United States
 Gilroy station, commuter rail station
 Gilroy College, college in New South Wales, Australia

See also 
 
 
 Kilroy (disambiguation)